The Lebam River is a river and surrounding wetlands located near Desaru, in the eastern part of the state of Johor, Malaysia. The Johor National Parks Agency (Perbadanan Taman Negara Johor) wants to promote the wetlands as a stopover site according to the Ramsar Convention and for the tourism industry. Visitors may take a boat to explore the wildlife, especially the fireflies living in the mangrove apple trees.

References

Kota Tinggi District
Rivers of Johor
Wetlands of Malaysia